St. Paul's Cathedral is the cathedral of the Episcopal Diocese of Western New York and a landmark of downtown Buffalo, New York. The church sits on a triangular lot bounded by Church St., Pearl St., Erie St., and Main St.  It was built in 1849-51 to a design by Richard Upjohn, and was believed by him to be his finest work.   Its interior was gutted by fire in 1888, and was redesigned thereafter by Robert W. Gibson, and it was designated a National Historic Landmark in 1987 for its architecture.

History
In 1848, vestrymen of St. Paul's in Buffalo formed a building committee to erect a new stone church. Being familiar with architect Richard Upjohn's work through his recently completed Trinity Church in New York City, they desired no other architect for the job, and immediately engaged Upjohn for the commission.

Major structural events:;
1849: construction started. 
1851: the cathedral was dedicated/consecrated. 
1870: the spires on top of the two towers were finished. 
1888: a fire caused by a natural gas explosion nearly destroyed the building.
1890: the church reopened after undergoing a renovation overseen by Robert W. Gibson.

The building was listed on the National Register of Historic Places as St. Paul's Episcopal Cathedral in 1973.  In 1987, the property was further declared a U.S. National Historic Landmark.

Architecture
The cathedral has an irregular plan, whose largest component is the nave.  It is built out of red Medina sandstone with an ashlar finish.  The walls of the nave are supported by buttresses crowned with Gothic finials.  The main tower and entrance portal are at the southwestern end; the tower rises , with a tall steeple topped by a cross.  A small tower rises  from the north end.  The interior features floors of slate and marble mosaic, with the floor around the altar made in France.  The altar is of Mexican onyx, and the chancel furnishings is of oak, all designed by Robert Gibson.

Gallery

See also
List of the Episcopal cathedrals of the United States
List of cathedrals in the United States
List of National Historic Landmarks in New York
National Register of Historic Places in Buffalo, New York

References

External links

Skyscraper page building entry
Emporis building entry
 The cathedral's baptisms, confirmations, marriages, and burial records, 1812-1970, are online courtesy of FamilySearch.org.

Historic American Buildings Survey in New York (state)
National Historic Landmarks in New York (state)
Churches on the National Register of Historic Places in New York (state)
Churches completed in 1850
19th-century Episcopal church buildings
Churches in Buffalo, New York
Gothic Revival church buildings in New York (state)
Tourist attractions in Buffalo, New York
Paul Buffalo
Buildings and structures in Buffalo, New York
National Register of Historic Places in Buffalo, New York
Richard Upjohn church buildings
Robert W. Gibson church buildings